Cape Carr is a prominent, ice-covered cape, lying  northeast of Cape Morse.

History
It was delineated from air photos taken by U.S. Navy Operation Highjump (1946–47). Identification of Cape Carr is based on the correlation of Wilkes' chart of 1840 with G.D. Blodgett's reconnaissance map of 1955, compiled from air photos, taking into account the relative southwest shift of Porpoise Bay from the 3456 to the 15464 map positions.

References 

Headlands of Wilkes Land